The 2015–16 Luxembourg National Division was the 102nd season of top-tier football in Luxembourg. The league season started on 2 August 2015 and ended on 22 May 2016, with a promotion/relegation playoff following on 27 May.

F91 Dudelange claimed the title on goal difference over defending champions Fola Esch.

Teams
RM Hamm Benfica, the 2014-15 Division of Honour champion, and UNA Strassen, which won the promotion play-off, were promoted to the top level for the first time in their history. Runner-up Racing FC rejoins the National Division just one year after their relegation.

Source: World Stadiums

League table

Results

Relegation play-offs
A match was played between Wiltz, the twelfth-placed team in the 2015–16 Luxembourg National Division and Jeunesse Canach, the third-placed team in the 2015–16 Luxembourg Division of Honour. The winners, Jeunesse Canach, earned a place in the 2016–17 Luxembourg National Division.

Top goalscorers

See also
2015–16 Luxembourg Cup

References

External links

Luxembourg National Division seasons
Lux
1